Huseman is a surname. Notable people with the surname include:

Dan Huseman (born 1952), American politician
Rick Huseman (1973–2011), American racing driver

See also
Husemann